Hierta is a surname. Notable people with the surname include: 

 Anna Hierta-Retzius (1841–1924), Swedish women's rights activist and philanthropist, daughter of Lars
 Lars Johan Hierta (1801–1872), Swedish newspaper publisher, social critic, businessman, and politician

See also
 Huerta (surname)